George Walter John Hemingway (8 August 1900 – 9 April 1975) was an Australian rules footballer who played with Essendon in the Victorian Football League (VFL).

Notes

External links 

1900 births
1975 deaths
Australian rules footballers from Victoria (Australia)
Essendon Football Club players